Cristian David Bejarano Santana (born 30 October 1992) is a Colombian football midfielder. He made his debut for AS Trenčín against Slovan Duslo Šaľa on 28 May 2011.

External links
at astrencin.sk

References

1992 births
Living people
Colombian footballers
Colombian expatriate footballers
Association football midfielders
Rangers de Talca footballers
AS Trenčín players
2. Liga (Slovakia) players
Primera B de Chile players
Expatriate footballers in Chile
Colombian expatriate sportspeople in Chile
Expatriate footballers in Slovakia
Colombian expatriate sportspeople in Slovakia